Nawabganj (also spelled as Nawabgunj and Nawabgunge in British Raj) is a Nagar palika and an administrative subdivision (or tehsil or pargana) of Bareilly district in the Indian state of Uttar Pradesh. A Sub Divisional Magistrate, also called Sub Divisional Officer, or pargana-adhikari (literally pargana-officer) is the head official.

Under the three-tier Panchayat Raj Institution system, Nawabganj comes under Bareilly Zila (district) Panchayat (ZP) and is a headquarters of block panchayat covering 86 gram panchayats. There are 1007 gram panchayats in Bareilly district and 52,002 Gram Panchayats in the Uttar Pradesh state.

History
Nawabganj was originally called Bijauria. The present name refers to a market built here under Asaf-ud-Daula, who was Nawab of Oudh in the late 1700s. The market quickly came to prosper, benefitting from its advantageous position on the road from Bareilly to Pilibhit, and in 1815 it was made the headquarters of a newly created tehsil and pargana (it had previously been part of Karor pargana in Bareilly tehsil). Around the turn of the 20th century, Nawabganj was described as a compactly built town, with markets held four times a week and generating significant trade in local produce. A large fair was held on the festival day of Dasahra. The population in 1901 was 4,199, consisting of 2,352 Hindus, 1,819 Muslims, and 28 Christians.

Demographics and geography 
In 1865, the population of Nawabganj town was 4,418 and population of Nawabganj pargana was 1,22,264. Population growth between 1891 and 1901 was only 2.2% because of severe droughts in 1860-61 and 1869-70.

The town of Hafizganj already existed when Nawabganj was founded. Hafiz Rahmat Khan founded Hafizganj in order to offer merchants a resting place on the road from Bareilly to Pilibhit. New ganjes or quasbas were established to lure foreign trade and credit towards the Rohilla territories.

The Imperial Gazetteer of India Vol 7 1908, gives statistics of area and population of Nawabganj Tehsil as follows:

Nawabganj Experimental Sugar Factory
The area was known for ingenious production of gur and sugar. Earliest known reference of this in British India is found in The Louisiana Planter and Sugar Manufacturers journal dated 18 January 1919. The report titled "The Improvement of the Indigenous Methods of Gur and Sugar making in the United Provinces" was published in 1916 in Imperial Agricultural Research Institute Bulletin 82, 1916  by William Edward Hulme, Sugar Engineer Expert to Government of India and R. P. Sanghi, Sugar Chemist, Nawabganj Experimental Factory. Reference to the paper (IOR/V/27/515/31 1916) can be found in British Library.

Nawabganj Experimental Factory was erected in 1914–15. The site chosen was a government farm.

As a sugar engineer, William Hulme was assigned to study the indigenous methods of sugar manufacture with a view to determining the best methods of extracting and concentrating the juice for the manufacture of gur and white sugar respectively, both on the scale within the means of individuals or small groups of cultivators, and on a scale suited to the resources of capitalists now engaged in the industry in India.

Rivers
Pungheli
The Pungeilee rises in a jheel near Mouzah Bhugnera in Pergunnah Jehanabad, traverses Jehanabad and Nawabgunj, and joins the Apsurha at Moondeea. It is fed by springs in its bed which is of clay and sand. The stara pierced through in sinking wells of the bridge on the pillibheet road were alternately clay and sand down to 20 feet below the surface, when boulders were first met with.

Kandu
The Kandoo is a small stream which rises near Aspore in Pergunnah Nawabgunj, and falls into the east Bygool and Bhursur in Crore. It is crossed by the Pillibheet road by an old masonry bridge near Sithra in Nawabgunj. The banks are steep, and there is very little irrigation from it.

Begul River Canals
The Bygool Canals take their origin from the Roodpore and Bhanpore earthen dams, and the Chooreyli and Giram masonry dams. After leaving the Terai, they run through Jehanabad, Ritcha, and Nawabgunj Pergunnahs. They consist of a group of small water-courses known as the Burha feeder, and the Sisona, Bhanpore, Nukutpore, Suseynia, Chooreylee, Girem, and Ougunpore Rujbuhas. None of them are more than about 10′ in width, and their velocity is 3′ per second. They can irrigate about 30,000 acres per year.

Politics

 Present Member of Parliament (MP) in Lok sabha : Mr. Santosh Gangwar, Bhartiya Janta party, holding the charge of State Minister of Finance Ministry,  in Government of India
 Present Member of Legislative Assembly (MLA) : Dr. Mukta Prasad Arya Gangwar
Mr. Kesar Singh Gangwar, who made fun of the masks belonging to Bhartiya Janta Party died of Corona virus. He was the MLA.

 Present Chairperson of Nagar Palika : Mrs. Shehla Tahir, Samajwadi party

Education
 University-
B.r. genius international school
 Mahatma Jyotiba Phule Rohilkhand University (Bareilly)
 Graduation College-
Adarsh Mahavidyalaya Hardua Nawabganj
 Gangasheel Mahavidyalaya, Faijullapur, Nawanganj
 Lal Bahadur Shastri Group Of Education institutions Hardua Kifaytulla Nawabganj, Bareilly
 Inter College-
 Bhagwati inter college
 Spice Sr. Secondary School 
Jay Prakash Narayan (JPN) Inter College
 Shri Krishna Inter College
 Jesus and Mary Inter College
 Government Girls Inter College
 R P GANGWAR INTER COLLEGE
 Spice Children Academy 
 Standard Moral Junior High School
 Jesus and Mary Institute of Distance Learning
 Mission Public School
 St. Thomas
 St. Paul
 Lalta Prasad SVM Inter college Nawabganj Bareilly
 Khushi technical training centre Ghass Mandi Nawabganj

Tourism
Nearby points of interest include:
 Bijauria Railway Station (3.1 km)
 Kainchi pul (near Bijauria Railway Station)
 Laal pul (near Bijauria Railway Station)
 Kamani Bridge (Purana Pul) 
 Jama Masjid (River bank of Panghaili)
 Bareilly (32  km)
 Nainital (142  km)
 Pilibhit (21  km)
 World-famous Jim Corbett National Park (178 km)
 Dudhwa National Park (120  km)
 Sitarganj (56 km)
 Haridwar (311 km)
 Nanakmatta, Nanaksagar (65 km)
 Mahendera Nagar (Nepal) (87 km)
 Pilibhit Tiger Reserve (55 km)
 Sethal (12 km)
 Hafiz Ganj (9.1 km)
 Barkhan (8.2 km)
 Oswal Sugar Mill Aurangabaad (5.1 km)
purana pull
Grem Dam ( 2 km )
Shiv polyhouse grem (3 km)
Ahemdabad (Village of Keshar Singh MLA)
VIP college like Bhagwati inter college, Krishna instr college, Jpn college, Ggic, St. Thomas, mission public school...

See also
 Administrative divisions of India
 Divisions of Uttar Pradesh
 Bareilly division
 Bareilly (Lok Sabha constituency)
 Municipal governance in India
 Zilla Panchayat (ZP)
 District Rural Development Agencies (DRDA)
 Uttar Pradesh Legislative Assembly

References

External links
 Government of Uttar Pradesh
 Bareilly official website (NIC)

Cities and towns in Bareilly district